Aguaí is a Brazilian municipality located in the eastern part of the state of São Paulo. The settlement Cascavel was established in 1887 near a railway station. In 1944, when it was separated from São João da Boa Vista, it became an independent municipality with the name Aguaí.

Geography

Limits
North
Santa Cruz das Palmeiras, Casa Branca, Vargem Grande do Sul, São João da Boa Vista

South
Mogi Guaçu

East
São João da Boa Vista, Espírito Santo do Pinhal

West
Leme, Pirassununga

Rivers
Jaguari Mirim River
Itupeva River

Notable people
Aline Villares Reis Football player

References

External links
  Website of Aguaí
  Aguaí online

Municipalities in São Paulo (state)
1887 establishments in Brazil